Lemberg Airport  is located  south of Lemberg, Saskatchewan, Canada.

See also 
List of airports in Saskatchewan

References

External links 
Page about this airport on COPA's Places to Fly airport directory

Registered aerodromes in Saskatchewan
McLeod No. 185, Saskatchewan